Arpin may refer to:

Companies
Arpin Group, an American moving and storage company
M. B. Arpin & Co., a British aircraft manufacturer

People
John Arpin (1936–2007), Canadian composer and musician
Marie Luc Arpin (born 1978), Canadian water polo player
Michel Arpin (1935–2015), French alpine skier
Odo Arpin of Bourges (c. 1060–c. 1130), French medieval crusader
Paul Arpin (born 1960), French long-distance runner
René Arpin (born 1943), French biathlete
Roland Arpin (1934–2010), Canadian educator and public administrator
Steve Arpin (born 1983), Canadian race car driver

Places
Arpin (town), Wisconsin, US
Arpin, Wisconsin, a village in the town
Lake Arpin, a lake in Quebec, Canada

See also
Arpine, a given name
Arpino (disambiguation)